When the Angels Swing is a live album by German girl group No Angels, released by Cheyenne Records and Polydor in association with Universal Music on 29 November 2002. Recorded in promotion of a special big band concert at the Berlin Tränenpalast on 2 October 2002, the album differs highly from the group's previous, mainstream pop releases in that they performed their songs with blues and jazz arrangements. Musicians Jens Kuphal and Till Brönner were consulted to work on the album which was inspired by the New York City Stork Club and several 1940s swing standards. Aside from the title, When the Angels Swing is not directly associated with the No Angels's 2001 single, "When the Angels Sing".

While the album failed to chart on the Swiss albums chart, it managed to peak at number 9 in Germany and number 22 in Austria. Primarily produced and arranged by Till Brönner, it spawned the Alison Moyet cover "All Cried out" as a single. The rest of the track list primarily featured re-arranged tracks, taken from the group's albums Elle'ments and Now... Us! except the only previously unreleased song "Funky Dance".

Background

In June 2002, No Angels released their second album, Now... Us!, which featured writing credits by all band members and received critical acclaim from many critics who had thought that the band would not last past their first album Elle'ments (2001). The album debuted at number one on the German Albums Chart and was eventually certified both platinum and double gold by the International Federation of the Phonographic Industry (IFPI). Its leading single "Something About Us", a musical response to what the band felt was intense and sometimes unfair and inaccurate media criticism at the time—predominantly resulting from their casting band image—became the group's third non-consecutive number-one hit in Austria and Germany. Still during the recording of Now... Us! in spring 2002, the girls thought about taking another musical direction and how their songs would sound with a different musical approach. Inspired by Robbie Williams's cover album Swing When You're Winning (2002), in September 2002, the group took a few weeks off to prepare for a special swing concert at the Berlin Tränenpalast.

Track listing

Charts

Certifications

References

External links
 NoAngels-Music.de — official website

No Angels albums
2003 albums
Polydor Records albums
Swing albums